Varattu Pallam Dam is an artificial dam constructed in hills  from Anthiyur in the Erode District. This dam irrigates nearby areas. A mountain road from Anthiyur leads to Kollegal.  Storage capacity of this reservoir is 1.39 TMC. This is the one of place who Hits 1200 MM rain in erode district. 

Buildings and structures in Erode district
Dams in Tamil Nadu
Year of establishment missing